A Mezquita is a municipality in the Ourense province in the Galicia region of northwest Spain. It is located to the very southeast of the province.

References  

Municipalities in the Province of Ourense